Tan Cheng Hoe is a Malaysian football manager and former football player who is the current head coach of Malaysia Super League club Selangor. He was assistant coach for national team during Dato' K. Rajagopal & Nelo Vingada era before seat as Head coach of Malaysian national team.

Career

Playing career 
As a player, Tan played for Kedah in three Malaysia Cup finals from 1988 to 1990. He lost the 1988 and 1989 finals, but finally won the trophy in 1990.

Tan made an appearance for Malaysia Selection in a match against Aston Villa on 20 May 1991. In September 1991, he was part of Malaysia B team managed by M. Karathu for TAAN Cup, an invitational tournament in Kathmandu Nepal. Malaysia B team won the tournament beating Tiong Bahru of Singapore 2–0.

Managerial career

Early coaching
Tan Cheng Hoe began his career at Kedah in 2003. Kedah were also keen for Tan Cheng Hoe to stay in football and offered him the role of coach which he held until October 2004.

Malaysia National Football Team
Tan was the assistant coach to K. Rajagopal from 2004 to 2013. Tan Cheng Hoe worked as an Under 19s coach for Malaysia from December 2004 until October 2009. Tan Cheng Hoe continued his development as coach for Harimau Muda from October 2007 until October 2009. Under Rajagopal and Tan, Malaysia achieved many good results such as reaching the quarter-finals of 2004 AFC Youth Championship and qualifying for the 2006 AFC Youth Championship. Malaysia also ended their trophy drought in regional football by winning the 2009 SEA Games and 2010 AFF Championship.

Kedah
A break from football lasting 5 years then followed with Tan Cheng Hoe's next role as manager at Kedah beginning in April 2014. In 2015, he helped Kedah win the Premier League to gain promotion to the Super League. He was named the M-League's Best Coach of the Year at the 2016 National Football Awards following the success in Malaysia Cup, finishing third in the Super League and reached the FA Cup semi-finals.

Malaysia National Football Team
Tan Cheng Hoe began his 2nd spell with Malaysia in April 2017 as he took up the position of assistant manager under Nelo Vingada. Tan Cheng Hoe was then made manager at Malaysia after Vingada stepped down following a string of poor results.

In the preparation for the 2018 AFF Championship, Tan had mentioned through an article published by the FOX Sports Asia that Malaysia are underdogs team and hope their country fans will not put their hope too much despite being drawn into a favourable Group A consisting of Vietnam, Myanmar, Cambodia and Laos, adding the favourites in the group would be Vietnam and hope their players will not feel too much pressure as there had been a lot of expectations from the fans. Surprisingly, he managed to lead Malaysia into the final after eliminating the tournament defending title as well five times champions of Thailand in the semi-finals.

This was continued in the finals first leg when the Malaysian team under his led also managed to hold the tournament favourites of Vietnam 2–2 at home in their second meet in the tournament despite the latter had already scoring two goals in the first half. However, in the second leg in Hanoi, his team failed to repeat the same success when the favourites scored a goal in the early first half of 6th minute and began tightening their defence, resulting in a 2–3 aggregate until the end of the match as a result of which Malaysia became the runners-up for the third time.

Tan continued to lead the Malaysian team in the 2022 FIFA World Cup qualification after he been reward by the Football Association of Malaysia (FAM) to manage the team for another two years until his contract ended in 2020. Although the team under his management able to easily routed Timor-Leste in the first round by 12–2 in aggregate to proceed into the second round, the team only able to defeating Indonesia by 3–2 in an away match before losing two matches against United Arab Emirates in home by 1–2 and against Vietnam by 0–1 in an away match where they meet again for the fourth time through his managerial career despite of all the promises Tan has made earlier to the Malaysian fans before the competition started. After the two consecutive defeats, he then led Malaysia to win one of the most famous matches in their history, beating neighbour and Southeast Asian powerhouse Thailand 2–1 to extend its unbeaten streak at home to Thailand, and Indonesia 2–0 also at home to keep maintaining Malaysia's World Cup dream alive.

In terms of personal accolades, Tan Cheng Hoe has a single Malaysian Manager of the Year award to his name.

On 3 January 2022, Tan has resigned as the head coach of Football Association of Malaysia (FAM) following Malaysia's failure to qualify for the semi-finals of the AFF Cup 2020 in Singapore.

Selangor
On 24 September 2022, Tan Cheng Hoe appointed as Selangor first team head coach.

Managerial statistics

Honours

Manager 
Kedah 
 Malaysia Premier League: 2015
 Malaysia Cup: 2016
 Malaysia Charity Shield: 2017

Malaysia
 AFF Championship runner-up: 2018

Individual
 FAM Football Awards – Best Coach Award: 2016

References 

1968 births
Living people
People from Kedah
Malaysian sportspeople of Chinese descent
Malaysian footballers
Malaysian football managers
Malaysia national football team managers
Kedah Darul Aman F.C. players
Association football midfielders